Bob Conti (born December 27, 1947) is an American percussionist best known for his double platinum compositions and performance works with Donna Summer, Bad Girls, Diana Ross and decades performing with Jose Feliciano. Conti also served as record producer with Feliciano on The Genius of Jose Feliciano Vol 1 & Vol 2, albums Conti produced on his own record label, Joyfull Productions.

On tour and in the studio from 1967 until present day, Conti has performed, traveled and recorded with artists in nearly every genre of music and in most every country worldwide. From Carnegie Hall with Jose Feliciano to sold-out performances with Donna Summer at the Hollywood Bowl, from the Sydney Opera House to the foothills of the Egyptian Pyramids. In the genre of Jazz, Conti has performed around the globe for decades at Latin and Jazz festivals, Ronnie Scott's Jazz Club, the Blue Note Jazz Club in New York and the Blue Note Tokyo. Conti has recorded on over 150 albums, in the genres of pop, jazz, Latin jazz, rhythm and blues, disco, New Age music, experimental music, and has served as lead vocalist, backing vocalist, record producer, songwriter, composer, television presenter and bandleader.

Early life

Conti was born in Brooklyn, where he joined the American Legion's Drum and Bugle Corp at the age of 12. As Doo-wop became popular on the streets of New York and across the nation in the early 1960s, Conti organized a group of street singers and performed in subways and neighborhood hallways. "I grew up in Brooklyn where there was an A Capella group on every corner. Singing Doo Wop was what I did almost every night – in the subway, at school, after school and wherever there was an echo."

At the age of 14, his family moved to Los Angeles where during the summer months he learned to play the saxophone, and by his second year at Venice High School Conti played Baritone Sax in the high school dance band, "The Crescendos". He also became the band's featured vocalist, performing in concerts all across the United States. At the same time and all throughout Conti's high school years, he worked with his own five piece band, "The Circle of One", where he wrote all the material and sang the lead vocals.

After high school Conti began college at Santa Monica College but soon thereafter his music took front and center stage. In the summer of 1969 there was a radio contest promoted by Wolfman Jack's radio station XERB, "The Mighty 1090" sponsored by Don Kelly, who at that time managed Wolfman Jack. The ad stated that the contest would be judged by Stevie Wonder's producer, Detroit Motown's legendary writer producer, Clarence Paul who also produced Marvin Gaye. The winner of the contest would get to record an album of music at XERB, be produced by Clarence Paul and become Wolfman Jack's personal back up band. Conti took the challenge and with his band, which included Bruce Turner on guitar (The Strawberry Alarm Clock), Jack Ryland on bass (Three Dog Night), Bart Hall on drums (Paul Horn), and Mike Warren (Diana Ross, Donna Summer), they won the contest.

Managed by Don Kelly, they went on to play performances from local venues to The Forum in L.A., with such artists as Smokey Robinson and The Miracles, Wilson Pickett, Carla Thomas, and The Temptations. Conti shared a house with Wilson Pickett's producer Yusuf Rahman, which led to him recording an album with Wilson Pickett: Join Me and Let's Be Free.

The producer H.B. Barnum heard Conti and his band, "The Circle of One," at a party that was being held at the home of Robert Stack. The next week H.B. took Conti into the studio as a solo artist and recorded two of his original compositions, "Clap in Time" and "Child Again". He was signed by Jubilee Records as songwriter and lead vocalist where "Child Again" was placed on national daily radio rotation.

Career
At 19 years of age Conti auditioned for and got the job as saxophonist and lead vocalist, traveling on the road with the band that backed The Platters. Buck Ram's Original "Platters" group was an American vocal group that had 40 charted singles on the Billboard "Hot 100 Chart" between 1955 and 1967, including four No. 1 hits.

From the age of 20 to the present time, Conti has performed with artists both in the studio and touring, including Diana Ross, Donna Summer, Gene Simmons, Wilson Pickett, Jose Feliciano, Richie Sambora, Paul Simon, Earth, Wind & Fire, Rita Coolidge, Helen Reddy, Karen Carpenter, Laura Brannigan, Player, Raquel Welch, and The Brooklyn Dreams, producing, writing and performing on over 150 albums. Conti's percussion work has also enhanced orchestras from The Tonight Show with Johnny Carson to the Academy Awards.

In addition to being a percussionist, Conti is a composer, publisher and musical director.  Conti is also a network TV bandleader and "2nd Banana" Sidekick, a.k.a., "Bobalou," for Host Brad Garrett (of Everybody Loves Raymond fame), on the ABC late night talk show, Into The Night, where he also wrote the show's theme song.

Soon thereafter, Conti co-created and served as the host of Road Stories with Frankie Avalon and José Feliciano. The theme song for this series was also composed, produced and performed by Conti.

Donna Summer years (1977–2010) 

As percussionist, vocalist, and writer, Conti performed with a then virtually unknown artist in the United States by the name of Donna Summer. This journey began in 1977 with an audition and an introduction to Donna by her musical director and Conti's close friend Michael Warren. Donna Summer went on to become the number one act in the world. Through his association with Donna, Conti met famed producers Giorgio Moroder and Pete Bellotte. After hearing Conti's percussion work (live and in the studio), Conti was asked to play on the soon to be double platinum Bad Girls album. He composed a song with Donna Summer on that album: "Can't Get To Sleep at Night". Conti wrote another song with Donna and keyboardist Virgil Weber for an album that was to be recorded at her first Hollywood Bowl performance, "Only One Man", which was chosen to be the flip side of "Heaven Knows", a duet sung by Donna and Joe "Bean" Esposito on the Live and More album. Conti would sing the duet "Heaven Knows" in concert with Donna whenever Joe was not available. Keith Forsey, drummer, percussionist, producer (Billy Idol, Flashdance, Ghostbusters), hired Conti to perform on his projects, as well. Conti performed with Donna through all the years until her last 2 Hollywood Bowl performances on August 22, 2008  and June 18, 2010.

José Feliciano years (1982–2016) 
Conti was performing with Raquel Welch at Caesars Palace in Las Vegas, when after the show José Feliciano's manager, Rick Hansen, came backstage and asked Conti if he would like to meet and play with Feliciano at his home. They met, played, and became close friends.  From then until 2016, Conti continued to tour on the road with Feliciano all around the globe from the United States, to Latin America, Southeast Asia, Europe, Israel, Australia, The United Arab Emirates (UAE), South Africa and beyond. Conti's association with Feliciano was not limited to performing and playing percussion. He has written songs for Feliciano, produced several of his albums, i.e., The Genius of José Feliciano, Volume 1 and Volume 2 and From the Heart. Together they've also performed and produced many of their original compositions, both live and in the studio. In addition to his professional credits with Feliciano, Conti is the godfather to Melissa Feliciano, the daughter of Susan and Feliciano.

Present day
Since coming off the road with Feliciano in 2016, Conti has been involved in charitable projects and has established a 501(c)3 Not-for-Profit corporation called "We Celebrate US," dedicated to "giving back", focusing on bringing people together through the arts.

In March 2017, Conti was sworn-in as Cultural Arts Commissioner of the Thousand Oaks, California Cultural Affairs Commission/Alliance for the Arts, a term that will continue through November 2019. The Cultural Affairs Commission (CAC) consists of 11 members and was established by the Thousand Oaks City Council in June 2010. The duty of the CAC is to provide advice on matters pertaining to the arts and cultural development in the city with priority focus on the Thousand Oaks Civic Arts Plaza/Center's Fred Kavli Theatre and the Janet and Ray Scherr Forum Theater.

Awards

Soundtracks and theme songs

Discography

Endorsements

 Roland Electronics/Roland V-Drums
 Toca Percussion 
 Latin Percussion Instruments
 Nike Footwear
 Peavey Electronics
 Machudo Cajons

References

External links
Bob Conti official website
Bob Conti Fan Area website
* 
*

1947 births
Living people
American percussionists
American pop musicians
American jazz musicians
American rhythm and blues musicians
American new-age musicians
Record producers from New York (state)
Songwriters from New York (state)
American jazz composers
American television hosts
American bandleaders
American male jazz composers
American male songwriters